Cheng Muyang (born 14 November 1969), also known as Michael Ching and Ching Mo-yeung, is a Chinese businessman and property developer based in Vancouver, Canada. His father, Cheng Weigao, is a high-ranking Chinese politician. 

In 1996, he was granted permanent residency in Canada, and he has applied for refugee status to flee political persecution from the Chinese government.

Biography
Cheng Muyang was born on November 14, 1969 as one of three children and the only son of Cheng Weigao, who at the time was the head of a tractor factory in Changzhou, Jiangsu Province. The elder Cheng was known for his role as the Communist Party Secretary of Hebei province between 1993 and 1998. Ching attended Zhengzhou Industrial College in Zhengzhou, the capital of Henan. He later acquired permanent residence in Hong Kong, and in 1996, he was granted permanent residency in Canada.

Michael Ching was accused by the Chinese government of having taken illicit commissions for a business deal using his father for political backing. Michael Ching moved to Canada in 2000, shortly before the Hebei procuratorate issued his arrest warrant. In 2006, the Chinese Central Commission for Discipline Inspection concluded that there was no evidence for criminal punishment of Cheng Weigao.

After moving to Vancouver, Canada in July 2000, he founded a land development company called Mo Yeung International. In 2002, he founded Sunwins which is a real estate development company in Vancouver. In 2012, Michael Ching received the Queen Elizabeth II's Diamond Jubilee Medal. In 2013, Michael Ching's application for Canadian citizenship was rejected, and as of 2015, his bid for refugee status was denied. Ching denied all allegations and sued the Canadian government for $1.75 million (CAD) for conspiring against him.

In July 2015, a Canadian federal judge ordered that Ching’s bid for refugee status be reconsidered. According to the judge, Justice Yvan Roy, the refugee panel that denied Ching’s application relied too heavily on Chinese court findings that had little or no evidence of illegal activity.

As of September 2016, Interpol no longer listed Ching as an international fugitive and deleted its "red notice" for him. Ching has filed legal action against the South China Morning Post and its reporter in the British Columbia Supreme Court for defamation and false statements.
After 15 years fighting, In Dec 2020,Michael Ching received his Canadian citizenship.

Residency 
In 1996, he was granted permanent residency in Canada. He has applied for refugee status as protection from political persecution after being considered a fugitive of law by the Chinese government along with his father, Cheng Weigao, a high-ranking Chinese politician.

References

1969 births
Living people
Chinese business executives
Chinese emigrants to Canada
Businesspeople from Vancouver
Canadian real estate businesspeople
Businesspeople from Changzhou
Applicants for refugee status in Canada
Chinese refugees
Real estate and property developers